In the Footprints of Mozart is a 1914 American silent short drama film directed by Tom Ricketts starring Ed Coxen, George Field, Winifred Greenwood, and Ida Lewis.

Cast
 Ed Coxen as Stanton, a young musician
 Winifred Greenwood as Ruth, his sweetheart
 Ida Lewis as Ruth's mother
 George Field as Mozart, age 30
 Charlotte Burton as Mozart's wife
 William Bertram as Joseph Allen
 Edith Borella as Wife of an old friend of Stanton
 John Steppling as a businessman
 Harry De Vere as a musician
 Adelaide Bronti as a poor neighbor

External links

1914 films
1914 drama films
Silent American drama films
American silent short films
American black-and-white films
Films about Wolfgang Amadeus Mozart
1914 short films
Films directed by Tom Ricketts
1910s American films